Gigi Fernández and Helena Suková were the defending champions, but competed this year with different partners.

Fernández teamed up with Natasha Zvereva and lost in quarterfinals to tournament winners Lori McNeil and Helena Suková.

Suková teamed up with Lori McNeil and successfully defended her title, by defeating Meredith McGrath and Larisa Neiland 4–6, 6–3, 6–4 in the final.

Seeds

Draw

Draw

References
 Official results archive (ITF)
 Official results archive (WTA)

Advanta Championships of Philadelphia
1995 WTA Tour